On 17 April 1948, 24 people died when the 17:40 Glasgow to London Euston train hauled by LMS Princess Royal Class 4-6-2 No 6207 Princess Arthur of Connaught was stopped after the communication cord was pulled by a passenger (a soldier on leave who presumably lived near Winsford and was seen to leave the train after it had stopped). The stopped train was then run into by a following postal express hauled by LMS Coronation Class 4-6-2 No 6251 City of Nottingham.

The signalman at  had, in error, reported the passenger train clear of the section and accepted the postal train.

The person who pulled the emergency cord was a railway employee who worked as a signalbox lad in Winsford Junction, but was currently serving in the army having been called up. He thought that the train would be perfectly safe because he knew how the signalling equipment of the time in that area worked; but he did not know that the train had stopped short of the track circuit, which would have reminded the signalman of its presence. He attended the enquiry to confess, and was still a signalman in Winsford Junction until he retired in the 1990s.

References

Railway accidents caused by signaller's error
Winsford railway accident
Winsford railway accident
Winsford railway accident, 1948
Train collisions in England
Railway accident deaths in England
Winsford railway accident